Douglas Gordon Roberts (30 May 1925 – October 1991) was an English professional footballer who made 113 appearances in the Football League playing as an outside forward for Northampton Town, Brighton & Hove Albion and Accrington Stanley.

Roberts was born in Foleshill, Warwickshire, in 1925. He worked for many years as a draughtsman for British Timken at Duston, Northamptonshire. He died in Northampton in 1991 at the age of 66.

References

1925 births
1991 deaths
Footballers from Coventry
English footballers
Association football outside forwards
Wolverhampton Wanderers F.C. players
Northampton Town F.C. players
Brighton & Hove Albion F.C. players
Accrington Stanley F.C. (1891) players
Rugby Town F.C. players
Cheltenham Town F.C. players
English Football League players
Southern Football League players